Dijana Jovetić (née Golubić; born 21 May 1984 in Zagreb) is a Croatian handball player. She plays for the Hungarian club Szombathelyi KKA and the Croatian national team.

She participated in the 2008 European Championship, where Croatia finished 6th. Jovetić was among the top-ten goal scorers of the tournament.

References

External links

1984 births
Living people
Handball players from Zagreb
Croatian female handball players
Olympic handball players of Croatia
Handball players at the 2012 Summer Olympics
RK Podravka Koprivnica players
21st-century Croatian women